LCA may refer to:

Technology
 Landing Craft Assault, a British landing craft of the Second World War. 
 LCA (Low Cost Apple), code name for the Apple IIe
 Light Combat Aircraft program, pursued by India for the development of the HAL Tejas 4th generation fighter jet.
 Liquid Crystal Attenuator
 Lower control arm, component of an automobile suspension
 Luminance-Chrominance-Audio, video signal standard, carrying brightness and color information on separate wires.

Mathematics
 Latent class analysis in statistics, a set of observed discrete multivariate variables to a set of latent variables
 Linear Correspondence Axiom, linguistic term belonging to the theory of antisymmetry
 Lowest common ancestor, in graph theory, the lowest node in T that has both v and w as descendants
 Large cardinal axiom, a type of proposed axiom in the field of set theory

Science
 Last Common Ancestor, the most recent common ancestor of two populations that came to be separated by a species barrier
 Longitudinal (or lateral) chromatic aberration, a form of colour distortion in optical microscopes
 Life-cycle assessment (or life-cycle analysis), a technique to assess environmental impacts of products

Medicine
 Leber's congenital amaurosis, a recessive genetic condition that causes blindness
 Left coronary artery
 Leukocyte Common Antigen

Places
 La Crescenta, California (Amtrak station code)
 Larnaca International Airport, Cyprus (IATA airport code)
 Little Caesars Arena, sports arena in Detroit
 London City Airport, a small airport in the London Docklands
 Saint Lucia (ISO 3166-1 country code, IOC country code)

Organizations
 Leeds College of Art 
 Lambda Chi Alpha, one of the largest fraternities in North America.
 Last Chance for Animals, a not-for-profit animal welfare organization
 Law Council of Australia
 LCA-Vision, a U.S. company providing LASIK vision services
 Legal & Corporate Affairs (internal legal department, e.g. at Microsoft)
 Legalise Cannabis Alliance
 Lexington Christian Academy (disambiguation)
 Lutheran Church in America
 Lutheran Church of Australia

Other
 Labor Condition Application, included in H-1B visa application
 Leaving Certificate Applied, a two-year programme of the Irish Department of Education and Science 
 linux.conf.au, the annual conference organised by Linux Australia (aka LCA)
 Liquor Control Act (Manitoba ministry)
 Lithocholic acid
 Low cost airline
 Landscape character assessment, the process of identifying and describing variation in character of the landscape; see